Thesongadayproject was created by the American singer-songwriter, Zachary Scot Johnson, in September 2012. The first day (September 6, 2012), featured a cover version of Donovan's "Catch The Wind". Johnson set out with a goal to record a song a day, every day, for as long as he could. As of April, 2022, Johnson has uploaded over 3, 500 songs, spanning over nine full years, and has accumulated over 41 million views.

Johnson performs originals songs and favorite covers. He included his email address in early videos so that viewers could send in their requests. He often performs music by favorite singer/ songwriters and has replicated many of his favorite albums in their entirety, including over 150 records by artists including Shawn Colvin, Patty Griffin, Lucinda Williams, Bob Dylan, Joni Mitchell, Bruce Springsteen, Jackson Browne, John Prine, Kacey Musgraves, Neil Young, Brandi Carlile, Elvis Costello, Kate Wolf, Tom Waits, Paul Simon, Johnny Cash, James Taylor, Suzanne Vega, Justin Townes Earle, Guy Clark, John Gorka, Dar Williams, Gordon Lightfoot, The Tallest Man on Earth, Todd Snider, Steve Earle, Emmylou Harris, Kris Kristofferson, Tom Petty, Tom Paxton, Townes Van Zandt, David Bowie, Mary Chapin Carpenter, Tift Merritt, John Hiatt, Ryan Adams, Merle Haggard, Kim Richey, Glen Campbell, Lyle Lovett, Lori McKenna, Loretta Lynn, Leonard Cohen, Rodney Crowell, Carly Simon, The Cars, Willie Nelson, Lucy Kaplansky, Patti Scialfa, Rosanne Cash, Colin Hay, Buddy Miller, Ray Price, Jason Isbell, Gram Parsons, Judy Collins, Joan Baez, Bobby Bare, Martyn Joseph, Nanci Griffith, Sheryl Crow, John Denver, Gillian Welch, Billy Joel, Linda Ronstadt, Bonnie Raitt, The Beatles, Donovan, Graham Nash, Dan Fogelberg, Carole King, Jeremy Messersmith and more.

His videos through day 2354 were recorded completely live, with no editing. At that point, he began using multi-track recording and playing multiple instruments and/ or adding vocal harmonies in most videos.

After the first full year of videos had gone up, Johnson began asking his favorite musicians to join him for guest collaborations. Over 250 musicians have joined Johnson for these videos, including:

Shawn Colvin, Donovan, Rosanne Cash, Jeff Daniels, Rodney Crowell, Marc Cohn, Creed Bratton, Noel Paul Stookey, Peter Yarrow, J.D. Souther, Lisa Loeb, Paula Cole, Collective Soul, Tom Paxton, Melissa Manchester, Jeremy Messersmith, Nellie McKay, Kris Allen, Mary Gauthier, Mary Black, John Gorka, Cheryl Wheeler, Richie Furay, Gaelic Storm, Sister Hazel, Sam Baker, Jon McLaughlin, Erin McKeown, Chris Pureka, David Wilcox, Ellis Paul, Peter Mulvey, Willie Nile, Fred Eaglesmith, Slaid Cleaves, Michael McDermott, Antje Duvekot, Storyhill, Alice Peacock, Al Stewart, Willy Porter, Eliza Gilkyson, Eilen Jewell, Dan Bern, Jake Shimabukuro, Dayna Kurtz, Rob Ickes, Livingston Taylor, Tony Furtado, Tim Easton, Maybe April, Ana Egge, Annie Golden, James Maddock, Anders Osborne, Ruthie Foster, Jonatha Brooke, Glen Phillips, Catie Curtis, Griffin House, Over The Rhine, Lucy Wainwright Roche, Laurie Berkner, Danny Schmidt, Carrie Elkin, Lily & Madeleine and more.

The 1,000th consecutive day featured a collaboration with Jeremy Messersmith. The two performed a duet of Sia's song "Chandelier".

The 2,000th consecutive day featured a collaboration with Gretchen Peters. They performed her song "Five Minutes".

On the 2,131st consecutive day, a pre-recorded intro from Cal Ripken Jr. showed before the video. Mr. Ripken congratulated Zachary for reaching the same number of consecutive days as matched his own "Iron Man Streak" in Major League Baseball.

References

YouTube channels launched in 2012